Nanyuan Subdistrict is one of the 14 subdistricts of Fengtai District, Beijing, China. It is located on the southeastern corner of Fengtai, neighbors Heyi Subdistrict and Nanyuan Township to the north, Donggaodi Subdistrict and Jiugong Township to the east, Xihongmen Township to the south, and Nanyuan Township to the west. The subdistrict has 61,926 residents as of 2020.

The subdistrict's current name comes from its location as southern part of the Imperial Garden of that used to exist in the region.

History

Administrative Division 
As of 2021, Nanyuan Subdistrict is made up of 18 subdivisions, with 15 communities and 3 villages:

See also 

 List of township-level divisions of Beijing

References 

Fengtai District
Subdistricts of Beijing